The Coppola House is a historic home located at Guilderland in Albany County, New York.  It was built about 1910 and is a three-story frame residence in the Colonial Revival style.  It features a gambrel roof with gables and dormers, a Palladian window, and a one-story surrounding porch with porte cochere.

It was listed on the National Register of Historic Places in 1982.

References

Houses on the National Register of Historic Places in New York (state)
Colonial Revival architecture in New York (state)
Houses completed in 1910
Houses in Albany County, New York
National Register of Historic Places in Albany County, New York